Faisal Darwish Ahmed (born 1 April 1996), he is a Saudi Arabian football player who currently plays for Al-Lewaa as a midfielder.

Club career
Faisel was a player in Al-Shabab Youth system, but in 2017 he was promoted to the first team by Sami Al-Jaber.

Al-Shabab
On 17 February 2017, Faisal made his debut in the 81' minute by substituting Hassan Al-Qeed in the 1–1 draw with Al-Khaleej.

References

External links
 

Living people
1996 births
Association football midfielders
Saudi Arabian footballers
Al-Shabab FC (Riyadh) players
Al-Qaisumah FC players
Al-Taqadom FC players
Al-Mujazzal Club players
Al-Thoqbah Club players
Bisha FC players
Al-Lewaa Club players
Saudi Professional League players
Saudi First Division League players
Saudi Second Division players